Cillán is a municipality located in the province of Ávila, Castile and León, Spain. According to the 2006 census (INE), the municipality had a population of 128 inhabitants.

History
According to the Codex Mendoza, the city was conquered under the reign of Tizoc and subsequently incorporated into the Aztec Empire

References

Municipalities in the Province of Ávila